Amir Khautiyevich Bazhev (born 15 October 1988) is a Russian professional footballer who plays as a midfielder.

Club career
Bazhev made his professional debut in the Russian First Division in 2007 for FC Spartak-MZhK Ryazan. He played in one Russian Cup game for the main FC Spartak Moscow squad.

References

External links
 

1988 births
Living people
People from Urvansky District
Russian footballers
Russia youth international footballers
Association football midfielders
FC Spartak Moscow players
FC SKA Rostov-on-Don players
FC Salyut Belgorod players
FC Fakel Voronezh players
PFC Spartak Nalchik players
FC Luch Vladivostok players
Al-Ahli SC (Amman) players
Russian First League players
Russian Second League players
Jordanian Pro League players
Russian expatriate footballers
Expatriate footballers in Jordan
Russian expatriate sportspeople in Jordan
FC Spartak-MZhK Ryazan players
Sportspeople from Kabardino-Balkaria